Herbert Ellsworth Slaught (1861–1937) was an American mathematician who was president of the Mathematical Association of America and editor of the journal American Mathematical Monthly.

Life and work 
Slaught, born in the Finger Lakes area, left his place of birth when he was 13 years old, due to the bankruptcy of the family's farm. The family moved to Hamilton, New York, where he studied at Colgate University, graduating in 1883. After teaching some years at the Peddie School (Hightstown, New Jersey), he received in 1892 a fellowship from the University of Chicago, where he was awarded a PhD in 1898. Slaught remained as professor at Chicago for the rest of his academic life, till his retirement in 1931.

In 1907, he became editor of the American Mathematical Monthly, a journal addressed to secondary teachers of mathematics. During his years as editor he worked heavily to broad the basis of the journal. He was founding member of the National Council of Teachers of Mathematics and an early member of the American Mathematical Society. He did not do research in mathematics, but his inspired teaching encouraged a lot of young people to follow a career in this matter.

References

Bibliography

External links 
 

1861 births
1937 deaths
19th-century American mathematicians
20th-century American mathematicians
The American Mathematical Monthly editors